Karl Gruber (3 May 1909 in Innsbruck – 1 February 1995 in Innsbruck) was an Austrian politician and diplomat. During World War II, he was working for a German firm in Berlin. After the war, in 1945 he became Landeshauptmann of Tyrol for a short time. He then became Foreign Minister of Austria until 1953.

Karl Gruber served as Austrian ambassador to the United States from 1954 to 1957 and from 1969 to 1972, as ambassador to Spain from 1961 to 1966, as ambassador to the Federal Republic of Germany in 1966, and as ambassador to Switzerland from 1972 to 1974.

Gruber was awarded the Grand Decoration of Honour in Gold with Sash in 1954.

See also
Gruber-De Gasperi Agreement

References

External links
 
 

1909 births
1995 deaths
Politicians from Innsbruck
People from the County of Tyrol
Austrian Roman Catholics
Austrian People's Party politicians
Foreign ministers of Austria
Members of the National Council (Austria)
Governors of Tyrol
Ambassadors of Austria to the United States
Ambassadors of Austria to Germany
Ambassadors of Austria to Spain
Ambassadors of Austria to Switzerland
Recipients of the Grand Decoration with Sash for Services to the Republic of Austria